Åkarp is a locality situated in Burlöv Municipality, Skåne County, Sweden with 5,617 inhabitants in 2010.

It is situated approximately 8 km northeast of Malmö and 13 km southwest of Lund. It has a railway station where the Skåne commuter rail network stops.

In 1120 the village was known as Acathorp, from the two words Åke (a Swedish man's name) and torp. Around the 15th century the name changed to Ågarp, and during the 16th century the name changed to Ågerup. The first record of the name Åkarp is from the year 1770.

Composer Lars-Erik Larsson was born in Åkarp in 1908.

References 

Populated places in Burlöv Municipality
Populated places in Skåne County
Populated places in the Øresund Region